This is a list of mountains and summits of Switzerland named after people. Only a few mountains were named after people, as it is not a common practice in Switzerland. These mountains were often named after those who were the first to climb them, but also after distinguished Swiss personalities, such as Guillaume-Henri Dufour, Henry Dunant and Louis Agassiz.

Most of the listed mountains are located in the Unteraar Glacier basin (8), on Monte Rosa (6), in the Mont Blanc massif (4) and in the Engelhörner massif (3).



List

See also

List of Swiss people

References

External links
Names - Swiss Mountains (Swissinfo)

Named after people
Mountains of Switzerland